The Legend Continues... is the eighth solo studio album by American recording artist Kokane. It was released in 2012 through Bud E Boy Entertainment with distribution by Cycadelic Records. Production was handled by Kokane himself along with Squeeze, Tha Chill, West Coast Stone, David Williams and J. Wells. The album features guest appearances from KM.G of Above The Law, Caviar and C-Bo.

The album reached number 196 on the US Billboard 200 albums chart, making it Kokane's the most successful studio album to date (along with Dr. Kokastien mixtape).

Track listing 

Sample credits
 Track "Where I Come From" contains elements from "Angel Dust" by Gil Scott-Heron and Brian Jackson

Personnel 
 Jerry Buddy Long, Jr. – main artist, producer (tracks: 1, 3, 6, 9, 10), executive producer
 Shawn “Cowboy” Thomas – featured artist (track 2)
 Kannon "Caviar" Cross – featured artist (track 2)
 Kevin Michael Gulley – featured artist (track 3)
 Big Squeeze – producer (tracks: 1, 3, 6, 7, 9-12), mixing
 Vernon Johnson – producer (track 2)
 WestCoast Stone – producer (track 4)
 David "DWizzey" Williams – producer (track 5)
 Jon Henderson – producer (track 8)
 Erik "Mr. E" Ramos – mixing

Chart history

References

External links 
 The Legend Continues by Kokane on iTunes

2012 albums
Kokane albums